Sardar Sulakhan Singh Puar was a 19th-century ruler and a general of Dal Khalsa under Sukerchakia confederacy during times of Sher-e-Punjab Maharaja Ranjit Singh. He inherited the command of sodhra fort from his father Sardar Daan Singh Puar under Sukerchakia confederacy.

References
"A History of Sikhs" by Kushwant Singh

People of the Sikh Empire
Sikh warriors